Ayala Land, Inc. (ALI) is a real estate firm based in the Philippines. It is a subsidiary of Ayala Corporation. It began as a division of Ayala Corporation until it was spun off and incorporated in 1988. It became publicly listed in the Philippine Stock Exchange (PSE: ALI) in July 1991. Its core businesses are in strategic landbank management, residential development, retail shopping centers, corporate businesses, and hotels & resorts. Support businesses are in construction and property management. ALI also derives other income from its investment activities and sale of non-core assets. Last April 2015, ALI bought a minority stake in Malaysian property developer MCT Bhd. in a P1.9-billion ($43-million) deal.

References

Ayala Land posts strong Q1 2017 profit, up 18% at 5.56B

External links
Ayala Land official website
Official Facebook Account

 
Real estate companies established in 1988
Companies listed on the Philippine Stock Exchange
Companies based in Makati